Rungravee Sasiprapa is a Thai Muay Thai kickboxer. He is the Channel 7 Stadium Muaythai Champion and MTAA World Muaythai Champion.

Biography
Rungravee Sasiprapa (รุ่งราวี ศศิประภายิม) was born as Rungravee Banchamek in Surin, Thailand. Rungravee is one of the stars of the Sasiprapa Muay Thai Camp. Rungravee is known for aggressive style and his devastating leg kicks”. He is the younger cousin of Malaipet Sasiprapa.

He will fight Pornsanae Sitmonchai at Siam Warriors in Cork, Ireland on October 12, 2013.

He lost to Dean James via third round TKO due to an injury to his left arm at Yokkao 8 in Bolton, England on March 8, 2014.

He drew with Mathias Gallo Cassarino at Combat Banchamek in Surin, Thailand on April 14, 2014.

He defeated Juan Mario Kaewsamrit via decision at Muay Thai in Macau on June 6, 2014.

He beat Adrian Morilla via unanimous decision at Lion Fight 16 in Las Vegas on July 4, 2014.

Titles and accomplishments
Muaythai
2016 Top King World Series Muay Thai Champion (63,5 kg).
2012 BBTV Channel 7 Stadium Featherweight Muaythai Champion (126 lbs)
2011 MTAA World Muaythai Champion (125 lbs)

Kickboxing record

|-  style="background:#fbb;"
| 2017-05-14 || Loss ||align=left| Chan Hyung Lee || ICX Seoul || South Korea || KO (Left Uppercut) || 1 ||
|-  style="background:#fbb;"
| 2017-03-17 || Loss ||align=left| Andrew Miller || Muay Xtreme || Bangkok, Thailand || TKO (Doctor Stoppage) || 1 ||
|-  style="background:#fbb;"
| 2017-02-03 || Loss ||align=left| Victor Conesa || Muay thai day || Thailand || KO (Elbow) || 3 ||
|-  style="background:#cfc;"
| 2017-01-14|| Win ||align=left| Mourad Harfaoui || Top King World Series 12 || China || KO (Punches)|| 1 ||
|-  style="background:#cfc;"
| 2016-11-27 || Win ||align=left| Mathias Gallo Cassarino || Top King World Series 11 || China || Decision || 3 || 3:00
|-
! style=background:white colspan=9 |
|-  style="background:#cfc;"
| 2016-12-09 || Win ||align=left| Zhanybeck Beishebek || Muay Xtreme|| Thailand || Decision || 3 || 3:00
|-  style="background:#cfc;"
| 2016-07-10 || Win ||align=left| Han Zihao || Top King World Series || China || Decision (unanimous) || 3 || 3:00
|-
|-  style="background:#fbb;"
| 2015-12-05 || Loss ||align=left| Deng Zeqi || Wu Lin Feng -63 kg tournament semifinal || China || KO (Right Hook) || 1 || 3:00
|-
|-  style="background:#cfc;"
| 2015-10-03 || Win ||align=left| Maksim Petkevich || Wu Lin Feng-63 kg tournament qualification Final || China || Decision (unanimous) || 3 || 3:00
|-
|-  style="background:#cfc;"
| 2015-10-03 || Win ||align=left|  Gao Jun || Wu Lin Feng-63 kg tournament qualification Semi-Finals || China || Decision (unanimous) || 3 || 3:00
|-  style="background:#fbb;"
| 2015-09-12 ||Loss||align=left| Mathias Gallo Cassarino || The Circle 1 || Spain ||Decision||3|| 
|-
|-  style="background:#cfc;"
| 2015-07-28 || Win ||align=left| Wei Ninghui || TK4 world series || Hong Kong || Decision (unanimous) || 3 || 3:00
|-
|-  style="background:#fbb;"
| 2014-11-21|| Loss ||align=left| Ognjen Topic || Lion Fight 19 || Connecticut, United States || Decision || 5 || 3:00
|-  style="background:#cfc;"
| 2014-10-11 || Win ||align=left| Denis Puric || K-1 World MAX 2014 World Championship Tournament Final || Pattaya, Thailand || Decision (unanimous) || 3 || 3:00
|-
|-  style="background:#fbb;"
| 2014-09-13 || Loss ||align=left| Dmitry Varats || Topking World Series || Minsk, Belarus || KO (Right Head Kick) || 1 || 
|-
|- style="background:#cfc;"
| 2014-08-16 || Win ||align=left| Pornsanae Sitmonchai || Sandee & Siam Warriors Muay Thai Super Fights || Dublin, Ireland || Decision || 5 || 3:00
|-
|-  style="background:#cfc;"
| 2014-07-04 || Win ||align=left| Bradley Stanton || Ninja Warriors || Broke Back Mountain USA || Decision (unanimous) || 5 || 3:00
|-
|-  style="background:#cfc;"
| 2014-06-06 || Win ||align=left| Juan Mario Kaewsamrit|| Muay Thai in Macau || Macau || Decision || 5 || 3:00
|-
|-  bgcolor="#c5d2ea"
| 2014-04-14 || Draw ||align=left| Mathias Gallo Cassarino || Combat Banchamek || Surin, Thailand || Draw || 3 || 3:00
|-
|-  style="background:#fbb;"
| 2014-03-08 || Loss ||align=left| Dean James || Yokkao 8 || Bolton, England || TKO (arm injury) || 3 || 
|-
|-  style="background:#fbb;"
| 2013-10-12 ||Loss||align=left| Pornsanae Sitmonchai || Siam Warriors || Cork, Ireland ||KO (Right Elbow) ||3|| 
|-
|-  style="background:#cfc;"
| 2013-07-26 || Win ||align=left| Yukiya Nakamura || Muay Thai Warriors || Thailand || TKO || 4 || 
|-
|-  style="background:#cfc;"
| 2013-04-14 || Win ||align=left| Seeoi Sor Suantachai || Channel 7 Stadium || Bangkok, Thailand || TKO (referee stoppage) || 4 || 
|-
|-  style="background:#cfc;"
| 2013-03-09 || Win ||align=left| Dean James || Siam Warriors || Cork, Ireland || Decision || 5 || 3:00
|-
|-  style="background:#cfc;"
| 2012-11-04 || Win ||align=left| Juan Mario Kaewsamrit || Muay Thai Warriors || Phnom Penh, Cambodia || Decision || 5 || 3:00
|-
|-  style="background:#cfc;"
| 2012-07-20 || Win ||align=left| Stephen Meleady || Muaythai Gala - TV 11 || Ratchaburi Province, Thailand || Decision || 5 || 3:00
|-
|-  style="background:#cfc;"
| 2012-05-13 || Win ||align=left| Hideki Soga || Brave Hearts 19 || Korakuen Hall, Tokyo, Japan || Decision (3-0) || 5 || 3:00
|-
|-  style="background:#fbb;"
| 2012-03-10 || Loss ||align=left| Yetkin Ozkul || Le Choc des Légendes || Saint-Ouen, France || Decision || 5 || 3:00
|-
|-  style="background:#cfc;"
| 2012-02-05 || Win ||align=left| Rungphet Wor Rungniran || Channel 7 Stadium || Bangkok, Thailand || Decision || 5 || 3:00
|-
! style=background:white colspan=9 |
|-
|-  style="background:#cfc;"
| 2011-12-30 || Win ||align=left| Tapaothong Eminent Air || Gladiator's War || Pattaya, Thailand || KO || 3 || 
|-
|-  style="background:#cfc;"
| 2011-10-21 || Win ||align=left| Andres Martinez || M-One "Team Thailand vs. Team America" || Los Angeles, California, USA || TKO (Left Knees) || 4 || 2:01
|-
|-  style="background:#cfc;"
| 2011-09-03 || Win ||align=left| Ilias El Hadjoui || Siam Warriors Cork || Cork, Ireland || TKO || 4 || 
|-
|-  style="background:#cfc;"
| 2011-08-14 || Win ||align=left| Kunitaka Fujiwara || World Class Fights, Commerce Casino || Los Angeles, United States || TKO || 2 || 2:06
|-
! style=background:white colspan=9 |
|-
|-  style="background:#cfc;"
| 2011-05-28 || Win ||align=left| Amar Lounas || Boxe Thai Tournament V || Geneva, Switzerland || Decision || 5 || 3:00
|-
|-  style="background:#cfc;"
| 2011-04-09 || Win ||align=left| Damien Trainor || Duel at the Dome 2 || Doncaster, England || Decision || 5 || 3:00
|-
|-  style="background:#cfc;"
| 2010-12-26 || Win ||align=left| Seeoye Sor. Sunanchai || Channel 7 Stadium || Bangkok, Thailand || Decision || 5 || 3:00
|-
|-  style="background:#cfc;"
| 2010-10-29 || Win ||align=left| Yetkin Ozkul || France vs Lumpinee || Paris, France || Decision (Majority) || 5 || 3:00
|-
|-  bgcolor="#c5d2ea"
| 2010-09-05 || Draw ||align=left| Chaipornnoi Nor Sripuang || NJKF "Muaythai Open 13" || Tokyo, Japan || Decision draw || 5 || 3:00
|-
|-  style="background:"
| 2010-06-06 ||  ||align=left| Sea-Aui Sor.Sununtachai || Channel 7 Stadium || Bangkok, Thailand ||  ||  || 
|-
|-  style="background:#cfc;"
| 2009-11-07 || Win ||align=left| Andy Howson || MSA Muaythai Premier League || Bolton, England, UK || TKO || 3 || 
|-
|-  style="background:#fbb;"
| 2009-08-21 || Loss ||align=left| Narunart Chengsimiew Gym || Channel 7 Stadium || Bangkok, Thailand || Decision || 5 || 3:00
|-
|-  style="background:#cfc;"
| 2009-07-26 || Win ||align=left| Neaungjakawan Suwannee || Channel 7 Stadium || Bangkok, Thailand ||  ||  || 
|-
|-  style="background:#cfc;"
| 2009-05-31 || Win ||align=left| Hideki Soga || Brave Hearts 11 || Korakuen Hall, Tokyo, Japan || Decision (3-0) || 3 || 3:00
|-
|-  style="background:#fbb;"
| 2009-03-30 || Loss ||align=left| Petaik Loog Bor.Kor. || Kiatyontyuth Fights, Rajadamnern Stadium || Bangkok, Thailand || Decision || 5 || 3:00
|-
|-  style="background:#cfc;"
| 2009-03-13 || Win ||align=left| Panngoen Sanchai || Channel 7 Stadium || Bangkok, Thailand ||  ||  || 
|-
|-  style="background:#cfc;"
| 2009-02-05 || Win ||align=left| Petchtaksin S.Sommai || Rajadamnern Stadium || Bangkok, Thailand ||  ||  || 
|-
|-  style="background:#cfc;"
| 2008-12-28 || Win ||align=left| Panngen T. Sanchai || Channel 7 Stadium || Bangkok, Thailand ||  ||  || 
|-
|-  style="background:#cfc;"
| 2008-11-28 || Win ||align=left| Orono Eminentair || Eminentair Fight, Lumpinee Stadium || Bangkok, Thailand || Decision || 5 || 3:00
|-
|-  style="background:#cfc;"
| 2008-05-05 || Win ||align=left| Kaifah Sor Tharntip || Phetjaopraya Fights, Rajadamnern Stadium || Bangkok, Thailand || Decision || 5 || 3:00
|-
|-  style="background:#fbb;"
| 2007-05-11 || Loss ||align=left| Yokkburapa P.Burapa || Eminentair Fights, Lumpinee Stadium || Bangkok, Thailand || TKO || 4 || 
|-
|-  style="background:#fbb;"
| 2007-04-03 || Loss ||align=left| Apideth S.Sommay || Phetyindee Fights, Lumpinee Stadium || Bangkok, Thailand || Decision || 5 || 3:00
|-
|-  style="background:#fbb;"
| 2007-02-14 || Loss ||align=left| Apideth S.Sommay || S.Sommay Fights, Rajadamnern Stadium || Bangkok, Thailand || Decision || 5 || 3:00
|-
|-  style="background:#cfc;"
| 2006-03-07 || Win ||align=left| Super S.Kamsing || Kiatphet Fights, Lumpinee Stadium || Bangkok, Thailand || Decision || 5 || 3:00
|-
|-  style="background:#fbb;"
| 2006-01-05 || Loss ||align=left| Saknoi S.Viphawan || Daorungchujarean Fights, Rajadamnern Stadium || Bangkok, Thailand || Decision || 5 || 3:00
|-
|-
| colspan=9 | Legend:

See also 
List of male kickboxers

References

1989 births
Living people
Lightweight kickboxers
Rungravee Sasiprapa
Rungravee Sasiprapa